Bayhan Gürhan (born 14 March 1980) is a Turkish arabesque singer who became famous after participating in Popstar Türkiye (Popstar Turkey).

Personal life 
Bayhan Gürhan was born on 14 March 1980 in Adana. At an early age he was interested in arabesque, Indian, and Arabic music. At the age of six he lost his mother and with the remaining of his family moved to Germany. There he learned to speak German. At the age of nine he was taken into custody by the German Child Protective Services. He had a good ear for music which did not go unnoticed. Because of that he was allowed to perform on his flute from time to time at the church of the CPS, and briefly took piano lessons there. He eventually returned to Turkey in 1991. Between 1998 and 2000 he had spent time in prison for murder.

In 2003 he was a contestant in the first season of Popstar Türkiye on Kanal D with judges Ercan Saatçi, Deniz Seki, and Armağan Çağlayan. After the third week of the show it was revealed that Gürhan had spent time in prison. When this got revealed in the media he was devastated. In the fourth week of the show judge Deniz Seki started to criticize him in the show over this. In the fifth week of the show he won the first place. This time Seki started to criticize the voters. The audience started to boo her which made her leave Popstar Türkiye. She was replaced in the sixth week by Zerrin Özer. Gürhan eventually finished in third place.

After the contest he released an album named Hayal Edemiyorum in 2004 and Kısa Veda in 2009.

In 2010 he performed at the Afyon Jazz Festival singing songs of Frank Sinatra, Andy Williams, and Louis Armstrong. In 2012 he appeared on STV in Hamdi Alkan's TV series Kendimize Doğru. He also appeared on Kanal D's TV series Ankara'nın Dikmen'i as a guest actor. In 2013 he presented the documentary Benim Yolum (English: My Way) about street musicians. In 2015 during the month of Ramadan, he played the character of Bekir in the radio show Direkler Arası on TRT İstanbul Kent Radio. In October 2016 he appeared on Star TV's Zuhal Topal'la İzdivaç (English: Marriage with Zuhal Topal), because he wanted to get married, but later left the show.

In 2017 Gürhan had sent a wreath of flowers to Deniz Seki's concert. Seki had recently been released from prison for drug trafficking. She responded on social media by stating that it had been a while since she made amends with Gürhan over her behavior at Popstar Türkiye. She appreciated the gesture and said that they were on good terms now.

Discography

Albums

Collaborative albums

Singles

Filmography

TV series

Television appearance 
 Popstar Türkiye (2003) – Contestant
 Mavi Şeker (2008) – Guest
 Akşam Keyfi (2009) – Guest
 Çarkıfelek (2012)
 Arım Balım Peteğim (2011) – Duet with Azer Bülbül
 Ben Burdan Atlarım (2013)
 Benim Yolum (2013) – Himself (host)
 Gündem Özel (2014)- Guest
 İnsanlık Hali (2016) – Guest
 Zuhal Topal'la İzdivaç (2016) – Candidate

Notes

External links 
 
 
 

1980 births
People from Adana
Living people
Turkish-language singers
Turkish male film actors
21st-century Turkish male actors
21st-century Turkish singers
21st-century Turkish male singers
Turkish folk-pop singers